This is a list of the guest cast of characters of the Filipino sitcom A1 Ko Sa 'Yo broadcast by GMA Network.

List of guest cast

Lists of guest appearances in television